Emlyn Jones, also known as Mickey Jones (born 29 November 1907) was a Welsh professional footballer.

Career
Born in Merthyr Tydfil, Jones played for Everton, Southend United and Shirley Town.

Family
Jones was one of five brothers who all played professional football, the others being Shoni, Ivor, Bryn and Bert. His son Ken and nephews Bryn and Cliff were also players.

References

1907 births
Year of death missing
Welsh footballers
Everton F.C. players
Southend United F.C. players
Shirley Town F.C. players
English Football League players
Association footballers not categorized by position